L'Enfant a la tasse or L'Enfant a la tasse, portrait de Jean Monet is an oil painting by Impressionist Claude Monet created in 1868. The painting – which features Monet's son Jean sitting next to a white and blue striped cup – is Monet's third painting to feature his son.

2013 sale 
The painting was listed on Amazon.com for sale at USD$1.45 million as part of its "fine art" initiative in August 2013. Economist Tyler Cowen criticized the initiative saying it "looks like dealers trying to unload unwanted, hard to sell inventory."

See also
 List of paintings by Claude Monet

References 

1868 paintings
Paintings by Claude Monet
Paintings of children